The Solomon Kimball House, probably built in 1696, is a historic First Period house in Wenham, Massachusetts.  Although named for nineteenth- and early twentieth-century owner Solomon Kimball, the house was built by Thomas and Mary (Solart) Kilham—he the veteran of a pivotal battle in King Philip’s War and she the sister and aunt of defendants in the Salem Witchcraft Trials.

Eighteenth-century owners included Speaker of the Massachusetts House of Deputies William Fairfield, and American Revolutionary War veteran Capt. Matthew Fairfield.

The house was added to the National Register of Historic Places in 1990.

History of ownership
 1701: Thomas Kilham sold his dwelling house, barn, orchard and house lot of 25 acres (along with 1.5 acres of meadow land in Lord’s Meadow, Wenham) to William Fairfield. Further research is needed to determine when and from whom Thomas bought the parcel.
 1725: William Fairfield gave the house and a house lot of 2 acres to his son Josiah Fairfield as a wedding gift
 William reiterated this gift on two subsequent occasions. First, in 1738, William gave Josiah one-fourth of William’s 45 acres of “homesteads and lands in Wenham and elsewhere” (reserving 16 poles for a burying ground) and another one-fourth to William’s son Benjamin—Josiah’s share including “Thomas Killam[ʼ]s homestead,” and Benjamin’s share including William’s homestead. Second, in his 1742 will, William refers to his deeds of gift to sons Josiah and Benjamin, and gives them the remainder of his real estate, representing 180 acres of “sundry parcels” in Wenham and Ipswich.
 Over the years Josiah added to the acreage of his house lot, expanding it to 46 acres by 1767. He appears to have had some financial difficulty around this time, however, because in January 1767 he sold various assets (his dwelling house, barn, “out houses,” house lot of 46 acres, additional parcels of upland and meadow, lots in Wenham Great Swamp, and his pew in the Wenham Meeting House) to his brother Benjamin for £600—and seven months later purchased the same assets (less a lot of upland and the pew in the meeting house) back from Benjamin for £550, and at the same time sold Benjamin 40 acres on the south side of current-day Maple Street (with barn) for 10 shillings.
 1771: Josiah Fairfield gave “the back part of my dwelling house [i.e., the lean-to] with the cellar under it and the entry that is between that back house & my dwelling house,” along with one-half of his cider house and cider mill, to his son Capt. Matthew Fairfield
 1777: Josiah Fairfield died and bequeathed all his real estate to his sons Matthew and Josiah, Jr., in reversion, after the death of his wife Elizabeth (Appleton) Fairfield. An inventory of Josiah’s real estate lists a “mansion house,” half a barn, half a cider house, a quarter of a cider mill and about 45 acres of land, the total value of which was £600.
 1783: Josiah’s widow Elizabeth (Appleton) Fairfield sued Matthew and Josiah Fairfield, Jr. to secure her possession of her late husband’s real estate, resulting with a six-acre house lot

 1797: Matthew Fairfield sold the property (i.e., a “mansion house” and six acres, including a “small piece of land” called “the nursery”) to Thomas Kimball and Joseph Fairfield for $333.33
 1810: Thomas Kimball died, the inventory of his estate including a house, “old” and “new” barns, a cow barn and “old shop.” Thomas' widow Huldah (Porter) Kimball died in 1835. Their son Thomas Kimball, Jr. eventually bought out his siblings’ interests in the real estate.
 1845: Thomas Kimball, Jr. died, and son Solomon E. Kimball inherited his house
 1924: Solomon E. Kimball died intestate, and son Elwell F. Kimball inherited Solomon’s “[f]arm in Wenham including land and buildings” valued at $5,500.00

Thomas and Mary (Solart) Kilham
Thomas Kilham (or Killam), son of Daniel and Mary (Safford) Kilham, was born in 1653 or 1654 in Wenham, and married Martha Solart circa 1680. Kilham was a veteran of King Philip’s War, serving under Major Samuel Appleton of Ipswich in Appleton’s campaign against the Narragansett, including the Great Swamp Fight of December 19, 1675. In May 1676 the General Court voted to repay soldiers for losses incurred, and voted £2 15d 6s for Kilham’s losses.

Martha (Solart) Kilham was the daughter of John, Sr. and Elizabeth (-----) Solart, who kept a tavern in Wenham, still standing at 106 Main Street. John Solart was financially successful, yet drowned himself in 1672 leaving an estate of over £500. His widow soon remarried Ezekiel Woodward, and kept her seven children from receiving their rightful share of Solart’s estate. Eventually, these children successfully petitioned the General Court for redress in 1682.

Martha was a sister of Sarah Good, who was one of the first three to be accused of witchcraft during the Salem witchcraft hysteria and was hanged in 1692. Sarah's 4 year-old daughter Dorothy Good (also known as Dorcas Good) was also accused and arrested for witchcraft. Dorothy Good survived the hysteria, but was the youngest to be accused of witchcraft during the Salem episode.

Thomas and Martha (Solart) Kilham had six children that we know of, all born in Wenham and the last two likely born in the Solomon Kimball House. However, Wenham's records of births for the periods 1681–1685 and 1688–1694 (and deaths for 1679–1694) have been lost. Consequently, we should keep open the possibility that Thomas and Martha had other children who were born and died during the 1680s and early '90s. After all, seven years passed between the birth of their son Thomas Jr. and the baptism of their son Samuel.
Thomas, Jr., born in 1684; died November 26, 1742, probably in Boxford, MA; married Sarah Maxey, April 8, 1712, in Topsfield, MA
Samuel, baptized in 1691; died after 1740, probably in Wilmington, MA; married Grace Endicott, December 21, 1715, in Boxford, MA
Martha, probably born between 1693 and 1696, assuming she was between 18 and 21 years old when she married; died December 27, 1754, in Ipswich, MA; married Timothy Bragg, December 23, 1714, in Hamilton, MA
John, born November 3, 1695; died January 15, 1738/9 in Boxford, MA; married Abigail Symonds, February 3, 1724/5 in Boxford, MA
Daniel, born May 25, 1698; died October 20, 1699, in Wenham
Daniel (2nd), born August 14, 1700; was living in Wilmington, MA as late as 1732; married Mary Kenney, February 17, 1725/6 in Danvers, MA

Thomas Kilham sold his house in Wenham to William Fairfield in July 1701 and moved to Boxford (MA). He died there in 1725 and his burial was likely the genesis of the Killam-Curtis Cemetery. Martha died after Thomas did, but no record of her death has survived.

William, Esther (-----) and Rebecca (Tarbox) Fairfield
William Fairfield owned the property from 1701 to 1725. He lived in a house near the current-day intersection of Cherry Street and William Fairfield Drive, a house that he probably built around 1687 coincident with his first marriage. (The land adjacent to Fairfield's house included a burial ground that the family started in 1691.) The Fairfield Farm was contiguous to the Thomas Kilham Farm, and Fairfield apparently bought the Kilham property as an investment. He gave the former Thomas Kilham homestead to his son Josiah Fairfield as a wedding gift in 1725.

A son of Ens. Walter and Sarah (Skipper) Fairfield, William was born October 14, 1662, in Reading, MA, and died on December 18, 1742, in Wenham. He was active in town affairs, and was Town Clerk 1706–1711 and 1724–1729; Moderator of Town Meeting in 1715, 1716, 1733–1736, 1739 and 1741; and was elected deacon of the First Church in 1731. He was a Representative at General Court in 1723, 1728, 1730, and 1732–1742, and “[d]uring the session of 1741, he was Speaker of the House of Deputies, at that time the highest office in the gift of the people, the Governor and Lieut. Governor being appointed by the King.”

 He appears to have been one of those shrewd, clear-headed, practical men, whose minds are formed and trained by reflection and experience, rather than by a knowledge of books, or by intercourse with the world. He held, at different times, every office in the gift of the people of his native town and State, and in all, he gained the confidence of those whom he was called to serve. He was also an active member of the church, and for many years one of its deacons.
 We regret that so little can now be ascertained concerning Mr. Fairfield. An anecdote is still told of him, which is quite characteristic. The common mode of travelling in those days was on horseback. Setting out to attend a session of the Legislature, he became so absorbed in thinking of the business on which they were to enter, and upon his duties as Speaker, that he is said to have actually reached Boston, bridle in hand, before discovering that he had left his horse at home.

William married twice. His first marriage was to Esther ----- about the year 1687. She was born circa 1668 and died on January 21, 1722/3 in Wenham. William and Esther (-----) Fairfield had thirteen children, all born in Wenham:  
Sarah, born July 23, 1688; died February 6, 1705, in Wenham (buried in Fairfield Family Burial Ground)
Mary, born December 18, 1689
William, Jr., born October 18, 1691; died October 24, 1691, in Wenham (buried in Fairfield Family Burial Ground)
William, Jr. (2nd), born November 17, 1692
Esther, Jr., born August 12, 1695
Tabitha, born May 17, 1696; died October 7, 1717, in Wenham (buried in Fairfield Family Burial Ground)
Abigail, born May 9, 1698
Elizabeth, born January 9, 1699/1700
Josiah, born October 12, 1701
Prudence, born July 13, 1704
Skipper, born January 2, 1706
Benjamin, born October 29, 1708
Rev. John, born November 29, 1712

William’s second marriage was to Mrs. Rebecca (Tarbox) Gott on October 14, 1723, in Wenham. Rebecca was born on August 8, 1672, in Lynn, MA, the daughter of Samuel and Rebecca (Armitage) Tarbox. Her first marriage was to John Gott, whom she married on July 19, 1693, in Salem, MA. (John Gott was the son of Charles and Lydia (Clark) Gott, was born on November 8, 1668, in Wenham, and died on January 25, 1722/3 in Wenham.) She died on July 29, 1765, in Lynn, MA. No children are recorded in Wenham’s vital records for William and Rebecca (Gott) Fairfield.

Capt. Matthew and Abigail (Ayer) Fairfield
Matthew Fairfield, son of Josiah and his second wife Elizabeth (Appleton) Fairfield, was born May 18, 1745, in Wenham (likely in the Solomon Kimball House), married Abigail Ayer on October 22, 1767, in Haverhill (MA), and died on February 11, 1813, in New Boston, NH. Matthew was the first of Josiah’s sons to reach adulthood, and it’s likely that when he married Abigail they took up residence in Josiah and Elizabeth’s house. This was certainly the case by 1771, when Matthew and Abigail were living in the lean-to of the house, Josiah and Elizabeth were living in the other part of the house, and Josiah gave Matthew the lean-to and part of the cellar (along with one half of a cider house and cider mill nearby).

Matthew Fairfield was a veteran of the American Revolutionary War. In December 1774 he was appointed to the three-member town committee that enlisted Wenham’s minutemen. Once the fighting began, he was a private in Capt. Billy Porter’s company of minutemen, Col. John Baker’s regiment, which marched on the alarm of April 19, 1775, serving five days but arriving too late to see the Battles of Lexington and Concord. When Matthew came home, he enlisted at Gloucester (MA) in Col. Samuel Gerrish’s Regiment, and was stationed at Chelsea from early May through December of 1775, being promoted to lieutenant by early June. While stationed at Chelsea, Matthew was part of the Siege of Boston and was at the Battle of Chelsea Creek (May 27 and 28) and the Battle of Bunker Hill (June 17).

As a result of the Continental Army’s reorganization of January 1, 1776, Fairfield was assigned to Col. John Greaton’s 24th Continental Regiment with the rank of lieutenant, and served with this regiment throughout 1776 fighting at the Battle of Trois-Rivières, Quebec (June 8) and the Battle of Valcour Island, Lake Champlain (October 11). The 24th Continental rejoined Gen. Washington’s main army in November 1776 in Morristown, New Jersey, in anticipation of the year-end expiration of many of its troops’ enlistments, and in anticipation of winter quartering. Matthew re-enlisted and was promoted to captain on January 1, 1777, as part of the reorganization of the 13th Massachusetts Regiment (Col. Edward Wigglesworth commanding). He served under Wigglesworth for much of 1777, encamped outside Philadelphia, but did not see battle during this period. Furloughed on August 22 for 60 days, he was discharged on October 22, 1777, the dates of his furlough and discharge apparently linked to the illness and death of his father Josiah Fairfield.

Fairfield was initiated into the Masons in April of 1777, and held the office of Steward for the United States Lodge in Danvers in October 1778.

At some point during the Revolution, Capt. Fairfield and his company were sent to Hillsborough County, New Hampshire
 to quell the Tory insurrections, or mobs, that existed … where the old loyal Scotch element so largely predominated. … His greatest troubles were in New Boston, where the Tories had their rendezvous. But it appears that here he found friends, and soon after the war he moved his family from Wenham, Mass., to New Boston, and settled on a tract of land in the south part of the town, where he resided until his death, in 1814 [sic], which was occasioned by the falling of a tree.

Abigail Ayer was the daughter of David and Hannah (Shepard) Ayer, and was born in Haverhill (MA) on November 24, 1746. She died in New Boston on January 28, 1825.

Matthew and Abigail had twelve children, perhaps nine of whom were likely born in the Solomon Kimball House:
Nabby (Abigail), born July 25, 1768, Wenham; died December 24, 1796
Betsey (Elizabeth), born April 28, 1770, Wenham; married William Crombie, April 27, 1797
John, born February 11, 1773, Wenham; married Mehitable Baker (intention recorded October 12, 1799, Wenham)
Hannah, born February 4, 1775, Wenham; died August 8, 1809; married Capt. Joseph Wilson
Alice, died in infancy October 20, 1777, Wenham  
Sarah (Sally), baptized August 29, 1779, Wenham; married Benjamin Fairfield (intention recorded April 3, 1803, Wenham)
Walter, died in infancy
William, died in infancy
Charlotte, baptized October 31, 1784, Wenham; married Capt. Joseph Wilson, her widower brother-in-law
Josiah, perhaps born in New Boston, NH; died in infancy
Matthew, Jr., perhaps born in New Boston, NH; died in infancy
William (2nd), perhaps born in New Boston, NH; died in infancy

Maps
 1795: Surveyed by Richard Dodge, this is the oldest map known of Wenham, and shows the town’s boundaries, roads and major bodies of water. Current-day Maple Street appears, as does that portion of current-day Topsfield Road northwest of Maple Street. (Note that current-day Topsfield Road did not extend to the Beverly town line, but stopped at current-day Maple and Cherry Streets.) 
 1831: Surveyed by Philander Anderson, this map shows the expansion of Wenham’s system of roads, the addition of swampland, and a drawing of the Wenham Meeting House.

 1872: This map shows the Solomon Kimball House as “T. Kimball Est[ate].” The “A. Bagley” house, near the northeast corner of the intersection of current-day Cherry Street and Topsfield Road, was the William Fairfield homestead.
 1884: This map shows the Solomon Kimball House as “S. Kimball.”

 1910 (Western & Central Wenham): This map shows the Solomon Kimball House as “S Kimball” and provides the location of the house itself as well as three out buildings. The outline of the house indicates an ell or porch at the northeast corner of the building that no longer exists.
 1910 (Maple & Bomer Streets): This on-the-ground survey of properties adjacent to Maple and Bomer Streets (Bomer Street subsequently known as the portion of Topsfield Road southwest of Maple and Cherry Streets) shows the location of an orchard and garden belonging to Solomon Kimball, northwest of the Moulton lot (which was opposite Company Lane). The 1910 map of western and central Wenham, however—which likely was not drawn from an on-the-ground survey—identifies the lot northwest of the Moulton lot as “Hrs. E. Kimball” (or heirs of E. Kimball). This label is probably a typo; the lot northwest of the Moulton lot would have been owned by heirs of Thomas Kimball or by Solomon Kimball himself.

 1955: The subdivision of the Solomon Kimball farm began in 1955 and continued through the mid-1960s, creating Puritan Road, Mayflower Drive and the lots facing those streets. This 1955 map, drawn at the beginning of the subdivision program, shows the location and outline of the Solomon Kimball House and two outbuildings; note the outline of an ell or porch on the north side of the house that no longer exists.

See also
List of the oldest buildings in Massachusetts
National Register of Historic Places listings in Essex County, Massachusetts

Notes

External links
 Allen, Myron O., The History of Wenham, 1860
 Bodge, George M., Soldiers in King Philip's War,1896
 Fairfield Family Burial Ground
 Fairfield Family Genealogical Site — Includes photographs of the house taken in 1982
 Fairfield, Wynn Cowan, “Descendants of John Fairfield of Wenham,” 1953
 Findagrave.com inventory of the Killam-Curtis Cemetery (Boxford, MA)
 Findagrave.com inventory of the Fairfield Burying Ground, Wenham
 Findagrave.com inventory of the New Boston Cemetery (New Boston, NH)
 Findagrave.com inventory of the Wenham Cemetery
 Massachusetts Cultural Resource Information System (MACRIS)
 Moulton, John T., Inscriptions From the Old Burying Ground, Lynn, Mass., 1886
 Perley, Sidney, The Dwellings of Boxford, 1893
 Pool, Wellington, “Inscriptions From Gravestones in the Old Burying Ground in Wenham,” 1887
 Vital Records of Wenham, 1904
 Wenham Congregational Church Records

Houses completed in the 17th century
Houses in Wenham, Massachusetts
Houses on the National Register of Historic Places in Essex County, Massachusetts